The 1899–1900 French Rugby Union Championship  was won by Racing club de France that defeated SBUC in the final.

The winner of the tournament of province was SBUC that won the championship of Garonne, after the F.C. Lyon refused to participate at the final stage. Stade Bordelais beat S.O.E. Toulouse that leave the field contesting the hard play of their opponents.

Teams participating
Was the eight winner of regional championships .
 
 Paris: Racing Club de France
 North-West: Le Havre Athletic Club
 Centre-West: Vélo Sport Chartrain
 South West: F.C. Lyon
 Alps  : Stade grenoblois
 South: Stade Olympien des Étudiants de Toulouse
 South-West   : Stade Bordelais Université Club
 Littoral' : Olympique de Marseille.

Table of results

Final

Notes and references

External links
 Compte rendu de la finale de 1900, sur lnr.fr

1900
France
Championship